Tiberius Sempronius Gracchus  may refer to:
 Tiberius Sempronius Gracchus (consul 238 BC), father of Tiberius and Publius Gracchus.
 Tiberius Sempronius Gracchus (consul 215 BC), son of the above.
 Tiberius Sempronius Gracchus (d. 174 BC), son of the above, elected to the priesthood in 203 BC at a very young age.
 Tiberius Sempronius Gracchus (consul 177 BC) (–), also known as Tiberius Gracchus the Elder, son of Publius Sempronius Gracchus.
 Tiberius Sempronius Gracchus (-133 BC), better known as Tiberius Gracchus, son of the above and tribune of the plebs.
 Tiberius Sempronius Gracchus, condemned to exile  21 BC for being Julia the Elder's lover.

See also
Sempronia gens
Gracchi